is the third studio album released by An Cafe on March 14, 2008 in Europe and April 9, 2008 in Japan. The European release of the album also featured three bonus tracks which were previously only available as B-Sides on their last three singles, all of which were also taken from this album. A limited edition includes a DVD with the music videos for "Kakusei Heroism", "Ryuusei Rocket" and "Cherry Saku Yuki!!", as well as documentary footage from their Yagai de Nyappy tour.

The album debuted at number ten on the official Swedish album charts, and at twenty-sixth on the Finnish album charts.  It also peaked at No. 13 on the Japanese albums chart.

Track listing

References

2008 albums
An Cafe albums